Francisco Cubelos Sánchez (born 8 October 1992) is a Spanish sprint canoeist. At the 2012 Summer Olympics, he competed in the Men's K-1 1000 metres. He finished in 7th place in the final.

References

External links

Spanish male canoeists
Living people
1992 births
People from Talavera de la Reina
Sportspeople from the Province of Toledo
Olympic canoeists of Spain
Canoeists at the 2012 Summer Olympics
Canoeists at the 2020 Summer Olympics
ICF Canoe Sprint World Championships medalists in kayak
Competitors at the 2013 Mediterranean Games
Mediterranean Games gold medalists for Spain
Mediterranean Games medalists in canoeing
European Games competitors for Spain
Canoeists at the 2019 European Games
20th-century Spanish people
21st-century Spanish people